Christine Campo Alewine is an American oncologist and biologist researching immunotoxin therapeutics in pancreatic cancer. She is an investigator at the National Cancer Institute.

Education 
Campo completed a B.A. in chemistry and Asian studies at Dartmouth College. In college, she interned under chemist Karen Wetterhahn focusing on the environmental effects of toxic metals. It was in this lab that Alewine was introduced to MD–PhD programs and became interested in becoming a physician-scientist. She completed a postbaccalaureate program at the National Cancer Institute's laboratory of pathology from 1998 to 1999. Campo earned a M.D. and Ph.D. from the University of Maryland School of Medicine. Her dissertation in 2006 was titled, PDZ protein regulation of Kir 2.3. She completed internal medicine residency in the Osler Medical Training Program at Johns Hopkins Hospital followed by clinical fellowship in medical oncology at NCI.

Career and research 
She joined NCI's laboratory of molecular biology as an assistant clinical investigator through the support of the clinical investigator development program in 2014 and became a tenure-track investigator through the NIH Lasker Scholar program in 2016. Alewine researches the use of immunotoxin therapeutics in pancreatic cancer. Her lab and clinic are testing and refining two recombinant immunotoxins that target a protein called mesothelin that is present on the surface of several types of cancer tumor cells, including pancreatic, ovarian, and some lung cancers.

Personal life 
Alewine is married with two daughters.

References

External links
 

Living people
Year of birth missing (living people)
Place of birth missing (living people)
Dartmouth College alumni
University of Maryland School of Medicine alumni
National Institutes of Health people
American oncologists
Women oncologists
American women biologists
American medical researchers
Women medical researchers
21st-century American women scientists
21st-century American women physicians
21st-century American physicians
21st-century American biologists